Vorontsovo is a rural locality (a selo), one of two settlements, in addition to Olenegorsk, the administrative centre of the Rural Okrug, in Yukagirsky National Rural Okrug of Allaikhovsky District in the Sakha Republic, Russia. Its population as of the 2010 Census was 0; the same as recorded in the 2002 Census.

Geography
The village is located north of the Arctic Circle, in the lower course of the Indigirka, near the mouth of the Bolshaya Ercha.

References

Notes

Sources
Official website of the Sakha Republic. Registry of the Administrative-Territorial Divisions of the Sakha Republic. Allaikhovsky District. 

Rural localities in Allaikhovsky District